46th Avenue and Vicente station is a light rail stop on the Muni Metro L Taraval line, located in the Parkside neighborhood of San Francisco, California. The stop has no platforms; trains stop at marked poles before the cross street. The stop opened with an extension of the line on September 15, 1937.

Service 
Since August 2020, service along the route is temporarily being provided by buses to allow for the construction of improvements to the L Taraval line. The project is expected to wrap up in 2024.

References

External links 

SFMTA – 46th Ave & Vicente St inbound and outbound
SF Bay Transit (unofficial): 46th Ave & Vicente St

Muni Metro stations
Railway stations in the United States opened in 1937